Pigeon Township, Indiana may refer to the following places:

Pigeon Township, Vanderburgh County, Indiana
Pigeon Township, Warrick County, Indiana

See also 

Pigeon Township (disambiguation)

Indiana township disambiguation pages